Jefferson Station may refer to:
Jefferson City station in Jefferson City, Missouri 
Jefferson Street (BMT Canarsie Line)
Jefferson station (Jacksonville), in Jacksonville, Florida, United States
Jefferson Station (SEPTA), in Philadelphia, Pennsylvania, United States
Jefferson Fire Station, located in Jefferson, Wisconsin
Jefferson station (Iowa), located in Jefferson, Iowa